Thomas Junius Calloway (1866–1930) was an African-American journalist, educator and lawyer.

Calloway graduated from Fisk University in 1889 and was an undergraduate classmate of W. E. B. Du Bois. He went on to attend law school at  Howard University, earning a law degree in 1894.

He was appointed as the US Special Commissioner in charge of The Exhibit of American Negroes at the United States pavilion at the Exposition Universelle held in Paris in 1900.

His home, the Thomas J. Calloway House, is listed in the National Register of Historic Places.

References

1866 births
1930 deaths
Fisk University alumni
Howard University School of Law alumni